Rashtabad or Reshtabad may refer to:
 Rashtabad-e Jadid, East Azerbaijan Province
 Rashtabad-e Qadim, East Azerbaijan Province
 Rashtabad, Gilan
 Rashtabad, Zanjan